The Fulton County Courthouse is a historic courthouse located at Rochester, Fulton County, Indiana.  It was built in 1895–1896, and is a four-story, Richardsonian Romanesque style limestone building.  It has a cross-hall plan and features a central bell and clock tower with a pyramidal roof.  In addition to the courthouse, the grounds have four memorials: one for the Pottawatomies' Trail of Death, a cornerstone for the Rochester College, and two war memorials.

The current courthouse is the third Fulton County courthouse, preceded by an 1837 log cabin and an 1846 structure.

It was listed on the National Register of Historic Places in 2000. It is a prominent building in the Rochester Downtown Historic District.

References

Clock towers in Indiana
County courthouses in Indiana
Courthouses on the National Register of Historic Places in Indiana
Richardsonian Romanesque architecture in Indiana
Government buildings completed in 1896
Buildings and structures in Fulton County, Indiana
National Register of Historic Places in Fulton County, Indiana
1896 establishments in Indiana
Historic district contributing properties in Indiana